Princess Salma bint Abdullah (born 26 September 2000) is the second daughter and third child of King Abdullah II and Queen Rania of Jordan. She was born at King Hussein Medical Center.

Early life 
Princess Salma is part of the Hashemite family. She attended the 'IAA' (International Amman Academy) as a twelfth–grade student. Princess Salma graduated from the IAA on 22 May 2018. In November 2018, Princess Salma graduated from the Royal Military Academy Sandhurst. She graduated from a short commissioning course, and became the first female jet pilot in the Jordanian Armed Forces in 2020.

She attends the University of Southern California.

Military career 
She was commissioned in the Jordanian Armed Forces as 2nd-Lieutenant (24 November 2018).

References 

2000 births
Living people
House of Hashim
Jordanian people of English descent
Jordanian people of Palestinian descent
Daughters of kings